Lethe goalpara , the large goldenfork, is a species of Satyrinae butterfly found in the  Indomalayan realm.

Subspecies
L. g. goalpara North India to  Assam,  Simla Hills, Sikkim
L. g. kabruensis  Tytler, 1939    Manipur (Kabru)
L. g. gana   Talbot, 1947   Upper Burma

References

goalpara
Butterflies of Asia